Gottschalkia  acidurici is a species of bacteria belonging to the family of Gottschalkiaceae. It was formerly placed in the genus Clostridium of the Clostridiaceae. It can be anywhere between 2.5 and 4 micrometers in length and anywhere between 0.5 and 0.7 micrometers in width.

References

Bacteria described in 1909